Michel Butor (14 September 1926 – 24 August 2016) was a French poet, novelist, teacher, essayist, art critic and translator.

Life and work
Michel Marie François Butor was born in Mons-en-Barœul, a suburb of Lille, the third of seven children. His parents were Émile Butor (1891–1960), a railroad inspector and Anna ( Brajeux, 1896–1972). He studied philosophy at the Sorbonne, graduating in 1947. He taught in Egypt, Manchester, Thessaloniki, the United States, and Geneva. He won many literary awards for his work, including the Prix Fénéon and the Prix Renaudot.

Journalists and critics have associated his novels with the nouveau roman, but Butor himself long resisted that association. The main point of similarity is a very general one, not much beyond that; like exponents of the nouveau roman, he can be described as an experimental writer. His best-known novel, La Modification, for instance, is written entirely in the second person. In his 1967 La critique et l'invention, he famously said that even the most literal quotation is already a kind of parody because of its "trans-contextualization."

For decades, he chose to work in other forms, from essays to poetry to artist's books to unclassifiable works like Mobile. For artists' books he collaborated with artists like Gérard Serée. Literature, painting and travel were subjects particularly dear to Butor. Part of the fascination of his writing is the way it combines the rigorous symmetries that led Roland Barthes to praise him as an epitome of structuralism (exemplified, for instance, by the architectural scheme of Passage de Milan or the calendrical structure of L'emploi du temps) with a lyrical sensibility more akin to Baudelaire than to Robbe-Grillet.

In an interview in the Museum of Modern Art, New York, conducted in 2006, the poet John Ashbery describes how he wanted to sit next to Michel Butor at a dinner in New York.

After meeting in 1977, Butor became a friend of Elinor S. Miller, a French professor at Rollins College at the time. They worked collaboratively on translations, catalogues and lectures. In 2002, Miller published a book on Butor entitled Prisms and Rainbows: Michel Butor's Collaborations with Jacques Monory, Jiri Kolar, and Pierre Alechinsky.

Awards and honors
 1956 Prix Fénéon, for L'Emploi du temps
 1957 Prix Renaudot, for La Modification
 1960 Grand prix de la Critique littéraire, for Répertoire I
 1998 Grand prix du romantisme Chateaubriand, for Improvisations sur Balzac
 2006 Prix Mallarmé, for Seize lustres
 2007 SACEM Grand prix des poètes
 2013 Grand prix de littérature de l'Académie française, for his body of work
 2016 Grand prix de poésie de la SGDL, for Ruines d'avenir : un livre tapisserie

Bibliography

Novels 

 Passage de Milan (Les Editions de Minuit, 1954)
 L'Emploi du temps (Les Editions de Minuit, 1956). Passing Time, trans. Jean Stewart (Simon & Schuster, 1960; Faber and Faber, 1961; Pariah Press, 2021).
 La Modification (Les Editions de Minuit, 1957). Trans. Jean Stewart as Second Thoughts (Faber and Faber, 1958), A Change of Heart (Simon & Schuster, 1959) and Changing Track (Calder, 2017; revised).
 Degrés (Gallimard, 1960). Degrees, trans. Richard Howard (Simon & Schuster, 1961; Methuen, 1962; Dalkey Archive, 2005).

Experimental texts 
 Mobile : étude pour une représentation des États-Unis (Gallimard, 1962). Mobile: Study for a Representation of the United States, trans. Richard Howard (Simon & Schuster, 1963; Dalkey Archive, 2004).
 Réseau aérien : texte radiophonique (Gallimard, 1962)
Description de San Marco (Gallimard, 1963). Description of San Marco, trans. Barbara Mason (York Press, 1983).
 6 810 000 litres d'eau par seconde : étude stéréophonique (Gallimard, 1965). Niagara: A Stereophonic Novel, trans. Elinor S. Miller (Regnery, 1969).

Travel writing 

 Le Génie du lieu [1-5] (1958–1996):
Le Génie du lieu (1958). The Spirit of Mediterranean Places, trans. Lydia Davis (Marlboro Press, 1986).
 Ou : le Génie du lieu, 2 (1971)
 Boomerang : le Génie du lieu, 3 (1978). Letters from the Antipodes, partial trans. Michael Spencer (University of Queensland Press, 1981).
 Transit : le Génie du lieu, 4 (1992)
 Gyroscope : autrement dit le Génie du lieu, 5 et dernier (1996)

Other 

 Illustrations [I–IV] (1964–1976)
 Portrait de l'artiste en jeune singe (Gallimard, 1967). Portrait of the Artist as a Young Ape: A Caprice, trans. Dominic De Bernardi (Dalkey Archive, 1995).
 Votre Faust: Fantaisie variable genre Opéra (with Henri Pousseur) (premiered 1969)
 Intervalle (Gallimard, 1973). Screenplay
 Matière de rêves [I–V] (1975–1985):
 Matière de rêves (1975)
Second sous-sol : Matière de rêves II (1976)
Troisième dessous : Matière de rêves III (1977)
Quadruple fond : Matière de rêves IV (1981)
Mille et un plis : Matière de rêves V (1985)

Poetry 

 La Banlieue de l’Aube à l’Aurore (Fata Morgana, 1968). The Suburbs from Dawn to Daybreak, trans. Jeffrey Gross (2013)
 La Rose des Vents : 32 Rhumbs pour Charles Fourier (Gallimard, 1970)
 Travaux d'approche (Gallimard, 1972)
 Envois (Gallimard, 1980)
 Exprès : Envois II (Gallimard, 1983)
Seize lustres (Gallimard, 2006)
Ruines d'avenir : un livre tapisserie (Actes Sud Editions, 2016)

Essays 

Répertoire [I–V] (1960–1982)
 Histoire extraordinaire : essai sur un rêve de Baudelaire (1961). Histoire extraordinaire: Essay on a Dream of Baudelaire's, trans. Richard Howard (Cape, 1969).
 Essais sur les modernes (1964)
 Essais sur Les Essaies (1968)
Improvisations sur Flaubert (1984)
 Retour du boomerang (1988)
 Improvisations sur Rimbaud (1989)
 Essais sur le roman (1992)
Improvisations sur Michel Butor : l'écriture en transformation (1993). Improvisations on Butor: Transformation of Writing, trans. Elinor S. Miller (University Press of Florida, 1996).
L'Utilité poétique (1995)
Improvisations sur Balzac (1998)
Improvisations sur Henri Michaux (1999)

Art criticism 

Hérold (1964)
Les Mots dans la peinture (1969)
 Vanité : conversation dans les Alpes-Maritimes (1980)
Avant-Goût [I–IV] (1984–1992)
 L'Embarquement de la Reine de Saba : d'après le tableau de Claude Lorrain (1989)
Parrure (1994). Ethnic Jewelry: Africa, Asia, and the Pacific, trans. Daniel Wheeler, Mary Laing, and Emily Lane (Vendome Press, 1994).
Quant au livre : triptyque en l'honneur de Gauguin (2000)

Interviews and conversations 
 Frontières : entretiens avec Christian Jacomino (1985). Frontiers, trans. Elinor S. Miller (1989).
 Entretiens : Quarante ans de vie littéraire (1999)
 Conversation (with Dan Graham), ed. Donatien Grau (Sternberg Press, 2015)

Compilations in English 

 Inventory: Essays by Michel Butor, edited by Richard Howard (Simon & Schuster, 1968; Cape, 1970). Translations of pieces from Répertoire I-III.
 Selected Essays, ed. Richard Skinner, trans. Mathilde Merouani (Vanguard Editions, 2022). Translations of pieces from Répertoire I-V.

References

Further reading 
 Courrier des Antipodes – Notes on Michel Butor’s Letters from the Antipodes by Pam Brown in Cordite Poetry Review
 Lydon, Mary, Perpetuum Mobile. A study of the novels and aesthetics of Michel Butor. University of Alberta  Press, 1980. 
 Rambures, Jean-Louis de, Comment travaillent les écrivains, Paris: Flammarion, 1978 (interview with Michel Butor, in French)

External links

Michel Butor page, University of Edinburgh

1926 births
2016 deaths
People from Nord (French department)
20th-century French novelists
20th-century French male writers
Lycée Louis-le-Grand alumni
Prix Renaudot winners
French male novelists
20th-century French poets
French male poets
French psychological fiction writers
Prix Fénéon winners